Caledonica is a genus of beetles in the family Cicindelidae, containing the following species:

 Caledonica acentra Chaudoir, 1869
 Caledonica bavayi Fauvel, 1882
 Caledonica affinis Montrouzier, 1860
 Caledonica tuberculata Fauvel, 1882
 Caledonica fleutiauxi Deuve, 1981
 Caledonica longicollis Fauvel, 1903
 Caledonica lunigera Chaudoir, 1860
 Caledonica mediolineata Lucas, 1862
 Caledonica mniszechii (J. Thomson, 1856)
 Caledonica myrmidon Fauvel, 1882
 Caledonica pulchella (Montrouzier, 1860)
 Caledonica rivalieri Deuve, 1981
 Caledonica rivalieriana Kudrna, 2016
 Caledonica viridicollis Deuve, 1987
 Caledonica rubicondosa Deuve, 2006
 Caledonica luiggiorum Kudrna, 2016

References

Cicindelidae